Sobo language may refer to:
Isoko language, an Edoid language spoken by the Isoko people in southern Nigeria
Urhobo language, an Edoid language spoken by the Urhobo people of southern Nigeria